Aimoin of Fleury, French chronicler, was born at Villefranche-de-Longchat, Southwestern France about 960. Early in his life he entered the monastery of Fleury, where he became a monk and then passed the greater part of his life. Between c. 980 and 985 Aimoin wrote about St. Benedict in Abbey of Fleury-sur-Loire.  His chief work is a Historia Francorum, or Libri V. de Gestis Francorum, which deals with the history of the Franks from the earliest times to 653, and was continued by other writers until the middle of the twelfth century. It was much in vogue during the Middle Ages, but its historical value is now regarded as slight. It was edited by G. Waitz and published in the Monumenta Germaniae Historica: Scriptores, Band xxvi (Hanover and Berlin, 1826–1892).

In 1004 he also wrote Vita Abbonis, abbatis Floriacensis, the last of a series of lives of the abbots of Fleury, all of which, except the life of Abbo, have been lost.  This was published by J. Mabillon in the Acta sanctorum ordinis sancti Benedicti (Paris, 1668–1701).

Aimoin's third work was the composition of books ii and iii of the Miracula sancti Benedicti, the first book of which was written by another monk of Fleury named Adrevald ( - 878). This also appears in the Acta sanctorum.

References

External links
Opera Omnia by Migne Patrologia Latina with analytical indices

960s births
1010s deaths
French chroniclers
French Christian monks
11th-century French historians
11th-century Latin writers